Flight 181 may refer to:

Lufthansa Flight 181, hijacked on 13 October 1977
EgyptAir Flight 181, hijacked on 29 March 2016

0181